The National Command of the Arab Socialist Ba'ath Party was the ruling organ of the party between sessions of the National Congress, and was headed by a Secretary General. Between National Congresses, the National Command was held accountable by the National Consultative Council (Arabic: al-majlis al-istishari al-quami). The National Consultative Council was a forum made up of representatives from the party's regional branches. However, the number of National Consultative Council members were decided by the size of the regional branch. The National Congress elected the National Command, National Tribunal, the party's discipline body, and the Secretary General, the party leader. The congress delegates determined the party's policies and procedures.

The National Command had sweeping authority. The National Congress was the only body which could hold a vote of confidence against the National Command. It had the authority to establish party organizations, to direct the affairs of subordinate party organs which, according to the party's Internal Rules, could not "for any reason direct themselves",  the authority to elect and dissolve a Regional Command, to approve party-to-party cooperation, to approve of the party's participation in government and legislative assemblies, to publish works in the party's name, to direct party policy on international affairs and decide on all matters regarding party policy. Because of these responsibilities several National Command organs were established, such as the Secretariat and the National Liaisons Office for instance.

Before 1954, the party was ruled by the Executive Committee, but this organ, along with others too, were replaced at the 2nd National Congress (for more, see "Structure" section). In Ba'athist jargon "Nation" means the Arab Nation, because of that, the National Command formed the highest policy-making and coordinating council for the Ba'ath movement throughout the Arab world. The National Command had several bureaus, similar to those of the Regional Command. National Command sessions were held monthly. Of these, the National Liaisons Office was responsible for maintaining contact with the party's Regional Branches.

Structure

Amid
 Michel Aflaq (1947–1954)
Secretary Generals
 Michel Aflaq (1954–1965)
 Munif al-Razzaz (1965–1966)
National Congresses
 1st National Congress (4–6 April 1947)
 2nd National Congress (June 1954)
 3rd National Congress (27 August – 1 September 1959)
 4th National Congress (August 1960)
 5th National Congress (8 May 1962)
 6th National Congress (5–23 October 1963)
 7th National Congress (12–17 February 1964)
 8th National Congress (April 1965)

National Consultative Council
National Tribunal
Organs of the National Command
 Secretariat
 Cultural and Research Department
 Propaganda Department
 Publications Department
 Information Department
 Finance Department
 National Liaisons Office

Members

References

Bibliography

 
Executive committees of political parties
Political parties established in 1947
Political parties established in 1954